Hemistomia napaia is a species of minute freshwater snail with an operculum, an aquatic gastropod mollusc or micromollusc in the family Hydrobiidae. This species is endemic to New Caledonia, where it is only known from one seepage in a rainforest in Tendea, Farino.

See also
List of non-marine molluscs of New Caledonia

References

Hemistomia
Endemic fauna of New Caledonia
Gastropods described in 1998
Freshwater molluscs of Oceania